Jitendra Chandra Paul, (also known as Jiten Paul or J. C. Paul); (1914-2014), was an Indian Bengali freedom fighter, journalist and author from Agartala, Tripura.

Life 
He was born into a Bengali family in British India (now Brahmanbaria, Bangladesh) in 1914. He was jailed for many years for participating in the Indian independence movement. He founded Tripura's first Bengali language daily newspaper Jagaran in 1954. He wrote more than 10 books. He died on 12 September 2014 in Agartala, Tripura.

References 

Indian journalists
Bengali writers
People from Tripura
1914 births
2014 deaths
Indian nationalists